Noël Desaubliaux (26 December 1922 – 5 June 2019) was a French sailor. He competed in the Star event at the 1960 Summer Olympics.

References

External links
 

1922 births
2019 deaths
French male sailors (sport)
Olympic sailors of France
Sailors at the 1960 Summer Olympics – Star
Sportspeople from Paris